KBZK (channel 7) is a television station in Bozeman, Montana, United States, affiliated with CBS and The CW Plus. Owned by the E. W. Scripps Company, it is part of the Montana Television Network (MTN), a statewide network of CBS-affiliated stations. KBZK has its studios on Television Way in Bozeman; its primary transmitter is located atop High Flat, southwest of Four Corners.

Although identifying as a separate station in its own right, KBZK is considered a semi-satellite of Butte's KXLF-TV (channel 4). As such, it simulcasts all network and syndicated programming as provided through its parent station but airs separate commercial inserts, legal identifications and weeknight newscasts, and has its own website. Although KBZK maintains its own facilities, master control and some internal operations are based at KXLF-TV's studios on South Montana Street in downtown Butte.

Bozeman's first commercial television station, channel 7 has been on the air since 1987.

History

Early years
In December 1982, Benny Bee, a radio DJ from Whitefish, obtained a construction permit for Bozeman's channel 7 allocation by buying out a competing application from Robert Cooper. Bee then entered into talks to secure an affiliation with ABC, which did not have a full-time outlet in the western part of the state (in the Missoula–Butte market, KXLF-TV and KPAX-TV had held first call rights to ABC programs since 1976). However, in what became a theme of channel 7's pre-launch years, its efforts were frustrated by other actors. In 1984, KXLF and KPAX, along with the other stations in MTN, became sole CBS affiliates. The Missoula-based Eagle Communications network—which also had a station in Butte—then obtained the ABC affiliation, which precluded it from being available to Bee's proposed Bozeman outlet.

In September 1984, Eagle Communications then filed to buy the KCTZ construction permit for $179,000, with a third of the purchase price to be paid in advertising credits with Eagle. However, the application—contingent on the FCC reversing a decision to delete the permit for failure to build—languished at the commission for more than a year. The reason why was that the Reier family, which owned KBOZ-AM-FM, had objected to the sale. It felt that local interests should have the opportunity to file for the channel and propose their own service. The commission granted the necessary extension in January 1986, but the sale to Eagle never materialized.

Bee then set out to build the station itself, only to find yet more opposition from the Reiers. Bee claimed that Karen Reier had telephoned him in March 1987 and inquired as to whether Bee would sell the permit; in July, Bee then sued the Reiers for $10 million in damage, claiming their actions had caused potential deals with Eagle and KOUS-TV in Billings to fall through.

At last, KCTZ began broadcasting on August 31, 1987. On its fourth day of operation, the station had to go off the air for five hours because its broadcasts interfered with medical telemetry equipment at Bozeman Deaconess Hospital that also used channel 7 spectrum. Having fought years of battles, however, Bee was thinly capitalized. When Bozeman Cable TV could not include the station on its lineup until after the start of 1988, starving it of much-needed advertising revenue, Bee decided he could hold out no longer and decided to put the station up for sale. He reached a deal with Big Horn Communications, owner of KOUS-TV, though he first had to offer Cooper the ability to buy KCTZ under the terms of his 1982 buyout. The transfer to Big Horn was approved in July 1988 and consummated that November, though the Reiers alleged that Big Horn had taken control without a formal application, leading to proceedings that did not end until 1991. At the start of 1993, Big Horn opened KSVI in Billings and moved all of KOUS-TV's programming to the new station, with no change to KCTZ.

Sale to KXLF
Big Horn put KCTZ on the market in 1990, but because of the overlap of contours of KCTZ and the Butte stations, at least one prospective buyer opted not to make a deal. In 1993, the Evening Post Publishing Company, owner of KXLF-TV, acquired the station and received permission to operate it as a satellite of the Butte outlet.

When the sale closed, KXLF's CBS programming and news moved to KCTZ from translator K26DE. "K26" and K43DU in Butte then inherited most of the ABC programming and the Bozeman local news that KCTZ had aired. After KWYB (channel 18) signed on in September 1996 and took the ABC affiliation in the Butte-Bozeman market, K43DU was taken off-the-air (the repeater was sold to Montana State University in 2001 and now carries Montana PBS); on October 31, after K26DE's ABC affiliation ended in advance of the launch of KWYB repeater K28FB (channel 28, now KWYB-LD), KCTZ became a Fox affiliate, and channel 26 returned to translating KXLF. During this time, channel 7 also took on a secondary affiliation with UPN.

KCTZ dropped Fox on August 21, 2000, saying that the network usually generated lower ratings than the Big Three television networks in smaller markets. At that point, the station once again became a satellite of KXLF-TV (though with separate advertising) and changed its call letters to KBZK-TV (the "-TV" suffix was dropped eight days later). Area cable systems then picked up Foxnet for Fox programming after an unsuccessful attempt to pipe in KHMT from Billings; the Butte–Bozeman market would not get another Fox affiliate until KBTZ (channel 24) signed on in 2003.

News operation
In April 1988, KCTZ began producing a local 6 p.m. newscast. The news programs aired on weekdays only. When KCTZ was sold to Cordillera, the newscasts moved to K26DE. Local news returned to KCTZ after the switch to Fox in 1996; the station aired a 9 p.m. newscast, replacing its prior 6 and 10 p.m. programs. however, after channel 7 became KBZK in 2000, the newscasts were canceled and replaced with simulcasts of KXLF's newscasts, retaining a small newsroom in Bozeman to cover stories from the area.

In 2007, KBZK returned to producing a separate newscast from its studios in Bozeman.

Technical information
In December 2021, Scripps filed petitions for rulemaking to relocate all five high-power MTN transmitters to the UHF band, including KBZK, for which Scripps proposed operation on channel 27.

Subchannels
KBZK airs the same digital subchannels as KXLF-TV:

Translators

Livingston is also served by a second transmitter of KBZK itself, which was approved in 2020 after the main KBZK facility was relocated to High Flat to retain service to Livingston.

References

External links

Montana CW

Montana Television Network
CBS network affiliates
The CW affiliates
Grit (TV network) affiliates
Ion Television affiliates
Court TV affiliates
Television channels and stations established in 1987
1987 establishments in Montana
E. W. Scripps Company television stations
BZK